Neofytos Tuddao Kyriacou (Greek: Νεόφυτος Κυριάκου; born July 18, 1995), professionally known by his stage name Phytos Ramirez, is a Filipino actor, model, host, and entrepreneur. He is known for his involvement in the Encantadia franchise, where he appeared in both 2005 and 2016 iterations.

Personal life and career
Ramirez was born in Athens, Greece, to a Greek father and a Filipino mother. He immigrated to the Philippines at a young age and grew up in San Mateo, Rizal. He started for modeling in television advertisements and made his acting debut via the late Eddie Garcia-directed film Abakada... Ina in 2001.

He first appeared on television via ABS-CBN's drama series Hiram in 2004. Ramirez guested on GMA Network's fantasy series Encantadia as the young version of Mark Herras' character Anthony.

Ramirez took a temporary hiatus from showbiz to focus on his studies and later returned on 2010 via Basahang Ginto. The same year, He signed a contract with Star Magic and appeared in some of ABS-CBN's dramas, including the remakes of their classics Mara Clara and Mula sa Puso.

Ramirez marked his comeback on GMA Network in 2014 via Paraiso Ko'y Ikaw.

On December 8, 2016, he opened a food stall business called Zorpas Greek Food, located in Marikina.

After his stint in the original series, Ramirez returned to the Encantadia franchise on February 27, 2017, where he portrayed the grown up Paopao in the 2016 remake.

Ramirez started hosting in Unang Hirit and he continued appearing in more of GMA's programs including Contessa, Madrasta, and from its sister channel GTV's The Lost Recipe, that previously aired on GMA News TV.

He converted to Born-Again Evangelical Christianity after years of being a Roman Catholic on November 23, 2017. In September 2020, Ramirez revealed his relationship with actress Cherry Lou.

Filmography

Television

Movies

Awards and nominations

See also
 John Manalo
 Greek settlement in the Philippines

References

External links
 
 Star Magic profile (archived)
 Sparkle GMA Artist Center profile

1995 births
Living people
Filipino male film actors
Filipino male television actors
Filipino people of Greek descent
Greek people of Filipino descent
People from San Mateo, Rizal
Male actors from Rizal
Filipino Christians
Filipino evangelicals
Converts to evangelical Christianity from Roman Catholicism
GMA Network personalities
GMA Integrated News and Public Affairs people
ABS-CBN personalities
Star Magic
21st-century Filipino businesspeople